The 2021 Cincinnati Bearcats football team represented the University of Cincinnati in the 2021 NCAA Division I FBS football season. The Bearcats played their home games at Nippert Stadium and competed as members of the American Athletic Conference (AAC). They were led by fifth-year head coach Luke Fickell.

Coming off a 9–1 season and a Peach Bowl appearance in 2020, Cincinnati began the 2021 season ranked eight in the preseason AP Poll. The team secured a signature non-conference win by defeating then-No. 9 Notre Dame on the road, 24–13, in the fourth game of the year. The Bearcats capped an undefeated regular season by defeating Houston in the American Conference championship game. In the final College Football Playoff rankings of the season, in which the Bearcats were the last remaining undefeated team, Cincinnati was ranked No. 4, earning them a spot in the national semi-final game to be played at the Cotton Bowl. This marked the first time a team from one of the Group of Five conferences was selected for a playoff spot. In that game, Cincinnati lost to first-seeded Alabama, 6–27, ending Cincinnati's season with an 13–1 record, and they were ranked fourth in the final polls. These marked the most wins and highest poll finish in Cincinnati program history.

Cincinnati's offense was led by quarterback Desmond Ridder, who led the AAC in passer efficiency rating and was named the conference's Offensive Player of the Year. Ridder threw for 3,334 yards and 30 touchdowns on the season. Running back Jerome Ford led the conference in rushing with 1,319 yards and 19 touchdowns. Three Bearcat offensive lineman were named to the first team All-Conference: Lorenz Metz, Dylan O’Quinn, and Jake Renfro. On defense, the team was led by consensus All-American and AAC Defensive Player of the Year, cornerback Sauce Gardner. Cornerback Coby Bryant was also named to the first-team All-Conference and several All-America teams, and was the recipient of the Jim Thorpe Award. Linebacker Joel Dublanko led the team in tackles, and defensive lineman Curtis Brooks led the conference in sacks. Head coach Luke Fickell was the recipient of several national and the American Conference's Coach of the Year awards. Nine Cincinnati players were selected in the 2022 NFL Draft, including fourth-overall pick Sauce Gardner.

Previous season 
In 2020, the Bearcats finished with a 9–1 (6–0 AAC) record, winning the AAC Championship Game against Tulsa. It was the first AAC championship in program history. After being ranked 8th in the final College Football Playoff rankings, the Bearcats were selected to participate in the Peach Bowl as part of the New Year's Six against Georgia. The Bearcats lost to the Bulldogs 24–21.

Offseason

Coaching changes
After the 2020 season, Marcus Freeman was announced as the defensive coordinator for Notre Dame. Mike Tressel was hired to replace Freeman as defensive coordinator, returning Tressel to Cincinnati where he had coached from 2004 to 2006.

Darren Paige was named the new running backs coach after the departure of Dan Enos.

Players

Transfers

Outgoing

Incoming

Recruits

Preseason

Award watch lists
Listed in the order that they were released

American Athletic Conference preseason media poll
The American Athletic Conference preseason media poll was released at the virtual media day held August 4, 2021. Cincinnati, who finished the 2020 season ranked No. 8 nationally, was tabbed as the preseason favorite in the 2021 preseason media poll.

Schedule 
The Bearcats' 2021 schedule consists of six home games and six away games. Cincinnati hosted two of its four non-conference games; Miami (OH) from the Mid-American Conference for their annual Victory Bell game and Murray State from the Ohio Valley Conference. They travelled to Indiana of the Big Ten Conference, and to Notre Dame in their first meeting against former Bearcats head coach Brian Kelly, winning both contests.

With the departure of UConn before the 2020 season, the American eliminated divisions for the 2020 and 2021 seasons. The Bearcats 2021 schedule included eight conference games – four home games and four road games. Cincinnati hosted Temple, UCF, Tulsa and SMU. They traveled to Navy, Tulane, South Florida, and East Carolina.

Schedule Source:

Personnel

Roster and staff

Depth chart

Game summaries

Miami (OH)

For the first time in the teams long and historic rivalry, the Bearcats and RedHawks would open their respective seasons against one another. The Bearcats enjoyed their highest ever preseason ranking at #8. In front of a sellout standing room only crowd, Bearcats senior quarterback Desmond Ridder wasted no time in asserting the Bearcats dominance and in a stark contrast to recent years got the Bearcats offense rolling early. On the second play from scrimmage, Ridder connected with Tyler Scott on a deep pass over the RedHawk secondary for an 81-yard score and 45 seconds into the game the Bearcats were up 7–0. After forcing a RedHawk punt, the Bearcats grinded out an 8-play, 97-yard scoring drive fueled by a 50-yard run by Jerome Ford and capped by a Ridder touchdown pass to Ryan Montgomery. The Bearcats scored a third time in the opening quarter after forcing a Redhawk 3 and out. Ridder capped another long scoring drive with his third touchdown pass, a 23-yard scoring strike to Josh Whyle and the rout was essentially on. Ridder would complete 20 of 25 passes for 295 yards, four touchdowns and add a 25 yards scoring scamper of his own in a little over 3 quarters as the Bearcats were never threatened, rolling to a 49–14 win. Ford added 121 yards rushing and a 21-yard scoring run of his own to lead the Bearcats in the rushing department. The Bearcats scored 42 unanswered points and didn't punt until their 4th possession up 21–0. Though the RedHawks did break the shutout in its 11th possession of the game with a late rushing touchdown by Kenny Tracy and scored again with an interception return for a touchdown off sophomore backup QB Evan Prater. On the following Bearcat possession, Prater got a measure of revenge with a pair of dazzling runs, the latter a 14-yard run that saw Prater somersault over a would-be tackler into the end zone for the game's final score. Despite forcing no turnovers (the first time in 20 games that they had failed to do so) committing 3 turnovers, only recording 2 sacks, and Miami holding the ball for over 34 minutes, the Bearcats kept the Victory Bell in rolling to their 15th straight win over the RedHawks. The win evened the all-time series at 59 wins apiece (with 7 ties). The win also extended the Bearcats home winning streak at Nippert Stadium to a school record 21 wins which with the Wisconsin loss to Penn State stands as the 4th longest active home win streak in FBS. (Clemson-28, Notre Dame-24, Ohio State-23)

Video Highlights: https://www.youtube.com/watch?v=Pcxh7q_AXg4&list=PLUvEY5-fj1NAQI7K7O5pAClbKrvWDYCLV&index=1&t=60s

Murray State

In what was supposed to be a tuneup for their upcoming meetings with Indiana and Notre Dame, the 7th ranked Bearcats hosted the FCS Racers. For a half, the Bearcats looked sluggish and the Racers held on to the ball. After the first period of play, the Racers had the ball 13½ minutes while the Bearcats had only run 3 plays on offense. The Racers took the lead on a short run by Preston Rice, but 4 minutes later the Bearcats leveled the score on a touchdown pass from Desmond Ridder to Noah Davis. The teams went to halftime tied at 7, with the near capacity crowd at Nippert showing their displeasure with the lackluster effort with a few boos.

The second half was a different story as the Bearcats offense finally asserted itself, scoring early in the 3rd quarter on a 13-yard run by Jerome Ford. Ford would find the end zone a second time in the quarter with an 8-yard run, to extend the lead to 21–7. The Racers continued to mount scoring drive attempts, but the Bearcat defense continued to squash scoring threats going into the 4th. The Bearcats looked to have wasted a good scoring chance when Ford fumbled inside the 30 early in the 4th, but the BlackCat defense forced a fumble 2 plays later and Ridder cashed it in with a nifty 23 yard scoring strike to Tyler Scott and the rout was on. Ford scored his third touchdown of the afternoon and reserve QB Evan Prater got in on the scoring with a scoring toss to Payten Singletary late to cap off a 42–7 win. The win extended the Bearcats home winning streak to 22, and with Ohio State's home loss against Oregon that afternoon, became the 3rd longest active home winning streak in the nation behind Clemson and Notre Dame.

Video Highlights: https://www.youtube.com/watch?v=PLXV-mEN5yE&list=PLUvEY5-fj1NAQI7K7O5pAClbKrvWDYCLV&index=2

at Indiana

With their supposed lackluster effort the previous week, the Bearcats were dropped to 8th in the AP rankings and traveled 129 miles west to Bloomington, Indiana to take on the Hoosiers of the Big Ten. A sellout crowd of better than 52,000 was on hand for the nationally televised matchup. Again the Bearcats started slow and the Hoosiers dominated the first quarter and most of the second. The Hoosiers scored on a pair of Michael Penix. Jr. touchdown passes, the first to Peyton Hendershot, in the 1st quarter, the latter to Stephen Carr in the 2nd. The Bearcats seemed to wake up after a personal foul, targeting penalty was called on the Hoosiers star linebacker Micah McFadden on a late hit on Desmond Ridder. McFadden was ejected and the Bearcats put together their first good drive of the game with Jerome Ford scoring 7 plays later from 6 yards out . The BlackCat defense forced an interception of Penix by Arquon Bush and got a 32-yard field goal from Cole Smith to cut the deficit to 14–10 at the half. 
The Bearcats forced the Hoosiers to punt on back to back possessions before rolling down field on a scoring drive. Jerome Ford giving the Bearcats their first lead of the game with a 3-yard run. The Hoosiers answered back with 5 play drive to retake the lead at 21–17. Tre Tucker returned the ensuing kickoff 99 yards for a score and despite extra point miss by Cole Smith the Bearcats were back in the lead. The Hoosiers answered again with 49 yard field goal and the Bearcats started the 4th down a point at 24–23 albeit with the ball and on the move. 8 plays into the 4th, Ridder found Alec Pierce on a fade to the end zone to put the Bearcats back in front. The Hoosiers tried to counter and again drove deep into Bearcat territory in an attempt to recapture the lead but Darrian Beavers forced a fumble and recovered the loaf inside the 5. The turnover squelched what would be the Hoosiers last best drive of the game. The Bearcats forced another turnover on the Hoosiers next drive as DeShawn Pace picked off Penix. Jr. and returned the ball to the 8. Desmond Ridder ran in from 7 yards out 3 plays later to ice the game. The Bearcats outscored the Hoosiers 38–10 after falling behind 14–0.

Video Highlights: https://www.youtube.com/watch?v=eWNf4wI7lDk&list=PLUvEY5-fj1NAQI7K7O5pAClbKrvWDYCLV&index=3

at No. 9 Notre Dame

After a bye week, the 7th ranked Bearcats headed 246 miles northwest for a high-profile matchup with 9th ranked Notre Dame. This was the Bearcats first visit to South Bend since 1900 (A 58–0 Irish win) The matchup was considered one of the top in the country for the week. The opposing coach being none other than former Cincinnati coach Brian Kelly who had resigned his position with the Bearcats in 2009 after a 12–0 season to take the vacated Irish head coaching position. Also on the opposing coaching staff was former Bearcat defensive coordinator Marcus Freeman, who left in 2020 to take the same position at Notre Dame. The Bearcats brought an impressive number of fans and aerial shots of Notre Dame Stadium showed large sections of red clad Bearcat fans. 
After a scoreless 1st quarter, the Bearcats forced an ill-advised pass from Tyler Buchner and DeShawn Pace intercepted the throw. 3 plays later, the Bearcats drew first blood with a short touchdown pass from Desmond Ridder to Leonard Taylor. The Bearcats kicked off and Irish return man Chris Tyree muffed the kick. Wilson Huber pounced on the loose ball and the Bearcats offense was back in business inside the Irish 20. After an 11-yard run by Ridder, the Bearcats looked to score and Ridder found Jerome Ford in the end zone, but the score was wiped out by an ineligible man downfield penalty. The drive stalled at the 5 and Cole Smith booted a 23-yard field goal to extend the Bearcat lead to 10. Near the end of the first half, the Bearcats put together an impressive 5 play 80 yard drive capped by a 27-yard touchdown strike from Ridder to Tre Tucker. The half ended with the Bearcats holding a 17–0 lead and the Irish being booed off the field having been shutout at home in the first half for the first time since 2011. 
The Bearcats took the 2nd half kickoff and mounted another good drive, but came away empty as Smith missed a 30-yard field goal wide right. The Irish mounted a serious drive of their own, but came away with no points as a 4th down pass was incomplete. The Bearcats drove again but disaster struck when Ridder was sacked, fumbled the ball and Irish lineman Drew White returned the stolen loaf 28 yards to the Bearcat 38. The Irish finally cashed in, taking only 4 plays to score. A Kyren Williams 4 yard run got Notre Dame on board and they trailed 17–7 heading into the 4th. After trading punts the Bearcats drove deep into Irish territory again, but again came up empty as Cole Smith pushed another field goal attempt wide left. The Irish made the miss hurt as they rumbled downfield and Drew Pyne hit Brenden Lenzy on a 32-yard touchdown pass. The damage was mitigated some as the Irish missed the extra point and the Bearcats now held a 17–13 lead. The Bearcats gamely responded with a punishing drive of their own. A 6 play 75 yard drive, highlighted by a crisp 32 yard pass and catch from Ridder to Taylor was bracketed by a pair of runs of 16 and 11 yards respectively by Jerome Ford. Ridder's 6 yard TD run, iced the game at 24–13. The Bearcat win snapped the Irish's 26 home winning streak which was the 2nd longest in the nation, the Bearcats 22 home winning streak at Nippert is now the 2nd longest behind Clemson.

Video Highlights: https://www.youtube.com/watch?v=BRBEeZm3dbY&list=PLUvEY5-fj1NAQI7K7O5pAClbKrvWDYCLV&index=4

Temple

Returning home with their highest in season ranking since 2009, the now 5th ranked Bearcats hosted the Temple Owls in the Bearcats AAC opener. The Bearcats looked to extend the nation's now 2nd longest home current home winning streak in front of a sold out Nippert Stadium and another nationally televised audience. After stopping the Owls on their first series, the Bearcats put together a 10 play 48 yard drive, capped by a 30-yard field goal by the embattled Cole Smith. The teams traded punts but the Owls Jadan Blue muffed the punt, the Bearcats recovered on the Temple 13 and quickly cashed in with Alec Pierce outjumping a defender to haul in a 9-yard touchdown pass from Desmond Ridder, after another Temple punt the Bearcats ground out another long drive and once again the Bearcats took it to the end zone with Jerome Ford pinballing off defenders for an 8-yard score. The Bearcats failed to extend their lead as Smith missed a 44 yard field goal attempt late in the 2nd. There were a few boos as the Bearcats left the field with a 17–3 lead though the Bearcats had only punted once in the half.

The Bearcats took the 2nd half kickoff and wasted no time asserting their will. On the first play of the 3rd quarter, Jerome Ford took the handoff, made a sharp jump cut after crossing the line of scrimmage, found a running lane and raced 75 yards for the score, electrifying an already rowdy "Nipp at Night" crowd. Again the teams traded punts on their next respective possessions, once again the Owls fumbled the punt, again the Bearcats recovered and again the Bearcats needed just 2 plays to make the Owls pay for the turnover. Tyler Scott shook the would be tackle of an Owl defender, headed up the sideline, made a nifty juke of another defender and cruised into the end zone for a 38-yard score. The rout was officially on from there. A Charles McClelland TD run and Ridder's 3rd TD toss, this one to Michael Young Jr. capped a 28-point 3rd quarter. Coach Luke Fickell cleared the bench and the reserves played the 4th. Sophomore Ethan Wright had the Bearcats lone score in the 4th with a 58-yard run and the reserve defense made a nice goal line stand to keep the Owls without a touchdown. Ridder finished with 259 yards and 3 TDs in 3 quarters of work, Jerome Ford set a career high with 149 yards and the Bearcats in addition to forcing 3 turnovers, held Temple's offense to 235 yards. Coach Fickell said during the postgame interview on 700 WLW that it was "The first complete game that we've played all year; offense, defense and special teams" The win extended the nations 2nd longest home win streak at 23 games. (Clemson 31)

Video Highlights: https://www.youtube.com/watch?v=INFM39NsVZM&list=PLUvEY5-fj1NAQI7K7O5pAClbKrvWDYCLV&index=5

UCF

Now with their highest ranking in school history, the 3rd ranked Bearcats hosted UCF on a bright sunny Noon start at Nippert Stadium. UC was under consideration to be the host site of ESPN College GameDay but was passed over in favor of top ranked Georgia hosting unbeaten Kentucky. The Bearcats asserted themselves after taking advantage of a partially blocked punt after the Knights first possession which gave them the ball inside the UCF 40. It took the Bearcats 8 plays to notch their first score with Jerome Ford punching it in from the 1. Another brief UCF drive stalled quickly and the Bearcats went 10 plays and 66 yards for another Ford score. Instead of their usual slow start, the Bearcats held a 14–0 lead at the end of the first quarter. The Bearcats showed no signs of slowing down in the 2nd as Desmond Ridder found Alec Pierce on a 19-yard scoring strike midway through the 2nd frame. UCF went three and out and the Bearcats extended their lead as Jerome Ford found a running lane and went through untouched for a 79-yard scoring run, his 2nd 70+ yard scoring run in as many games. The Knights couldn't muster an answer to that scoring drive as QB Mikey Keene was picked off by DeShawn Pace inside the Knights 35. Four plays later, Ford scooted in from 4 yards out and the rout was on. Ford notched 176 yards and 4 scores in the first half and for all intents and purposes his day was done. UCF finally got on the board late in the first half as Keene connected with Brandon Johnson from 13 yards out. The 2nd half was a sluggish affair with neither team able to generate much offense. After the Bearcats fumbled midway through the 3rd, the Knights assembled a solid lengthy drive and converted a 4th and 1 inside the Bearcat 30 to keep the drive going. But that drive ended in disaster on the next play as Keene tried to hit his receiver on the far side of the field; only to see CB Coby Bryant time the pass perfectly, pick it off, and dash 74 yards the other way with the stolen loaf for a touchdown. It was the 2nd time that Bryant has victimized the Knights with interception for a score (the other being in 2019) It was 42–7 at that point and as has been his wont, Bearcats coach Luke Fickell cleared the bench in the 4th with Ethan Wright and Evan Prater scoring for the Bearcats. The former score set up on a fumbled Knight punt inside their 10. The 56–21 win was the Bearcats 15th straight regular season win, their 24th straight at home, and marked the first time in program history (dating back to 1885) that the Bearcats had scored 50 or more points in back-to-back games.

Video Highlights: https://www.youtube.com/watch?v=4dmdvFAF0H8&list=PLUvEY5-fj1NAQI7K7O5pAClbKrvWDYCLV&index=6

at Navy

Sporting their highest ranking in school history, the #2 Bearcats traveled to the United States Naval Academy in Annapolis, Maryland to face the Midshipmen. The Bearcats won in their last visit to Navy-Marine Corps Memorial Stadium but it was a 2019 Military Bowl win over Virginia Tech. The Bearcats last visit to Annapolis to face Navy was a nightmarish 42–32 loss in 2017 in which the Bearcats gave up 569 yards rushing. The Midshipmen's triple option run offense would prove a unique challenge as they are one of the rare teams to actively use it. The Middies drove downfield on a 13-play, 79-yard drive that used nearly half of the quarter (7:12) and Navy QB Tai Lavatai scored from 2-yards out. The Bearcats answered this score after Navy tried to catch the Bearcats napping with an attempted onside kick. The Bearcats started the drive in Navy territory and 3 plays later got into the end zone with a 31-yard scoring strike from Desmond Ridder to Josh Whyle. The teams traded field goals in the 2nd quarter and Navy controlled the clock for much of the period as well. Late in the first half, the Midshipmen were in Bearcat territory and looking to take the lead into the half but at the Bearcat 25, Lavatai was stopped for a 3-yard loss and then sacked by DL Curtis Brooks for a 6-yard loss on the next play. This forced Navy to try a 51-yard field goal which was blocked by DeShawn Pace who recovered the live ball and ran it back 20 yards to the Navy 34 with 1 second left in the half. Alex Bales, who normally handles kickoff duties, came on to nail a 52-yard field goal to send the Bearcats to the half with an wholly unexpected lead. The Midshipmen tried to control the clock on their first possession of the second half but turned the ball over on downs. It took the Bearcats 4 plays to find the end zone as Jerome Ford broke loose on a 43-yard run to increase the Bearcat lead to 20–10, after a Navy three and out, the Bearcats put together another scoring drive with Ridder finding Whyle on a short pass to push the lead to 27–10 at the end of the 3rd. 
Navy battled back in the 4th, a Bijan Nichols field goal cut the lead to 27–13 and after a Bearcat three and out, the Midshipmen drove 90 yards in 16 plays with Lavatai scoring from a yard out with 51 seconds to play to cut the Bearcat lead to 7. The Midshipmen set up for an onside kick and incredibly were successful in recovering the ball. A disastrous collapse was averted when S Arquan Bush intercepted Lavatai at the Bearcat 44 with 25 seconds to play. The Bearcats won despite only having possession of the ball for 20:33, having their lowest yardage output (271) since the Temple game in 2019, being outgained (308–271), a 22–14 deficit in 1st downs and committing 11 penalties. The win was the 16th straight in the regular season, moved the Bearcats to 7–0 for the second straight year, and marked the first time that the Bearcats defeated Navy in Annapolis.

Video Highlights: https://www.youtube.com/watch?v=ZSACZi5o-ug&list=PLUvEY5-fj1NAQI7K7O5pAClbKrvWDYCLV&index=7

at Tulane

Retaining their #2 ranking in both the AP and Coaches polls, the Bearcats traveled to New Orleans to take on the Tulane Green Wave at Yulman Stadium. The Green Wave were on a 5-game losing streak coming into the match-up, but taking a page from the Navy playbook that frustrated the Bearcats the week previous, they grinded a ten-play drive that took 6:39 off the clock. They didn't score but pinned the Bearcats on their own 1-yard line. Undaunted, the Bearcats went on an 10-play, 99-yard drive highlighted by a 38-yard pass from Desmond Ridder to Alec Pierce and capped off by a Ridder scoring strike to Josh Whyle. After another lengthy, time-consuming Green Wave drive that resulted in a punt inside the 10, the Green Wave forced a pair of incomplete passes followed by a Marvin Moody sack of Ridder in the end zone for a safety. Taking the free kick, the Green Wave went on a 66-yard drive in 6 plays, capped by a 47-yard touchdown run by Tyjae Spears and were now in the lead at 9–7. The Bearcats responded with a scoring drive of their own. Desmond Ridder's 37-yard run to the three-yard line set the Bearcats up in the red zone and Jerome Ford's nationally leading 14th touchdown was the payoff. The teams traded turnovers as both quarterbacks threw interceptions, but the Bearcats' turnover resulted in points for Tulane as Merek Glover connected on a 41-yard field goal. The Bearcats took a 14–12 lead into halftime.

The teams traded punts to start the 2nd half, but on the Bearcats' second possession, a mix of passes and runs moved the ball 66 yards in 13 plays with Ridder finding Whyle for the 2nd time on a scoring pass, increasing the lead to 21–12. Following a Green Wave fumble forced by Joel Dublanko and recovered by Curtis Brooks, Christian Lowery connected on a 27-yard field goal. The Green Wave turned the ball over on downs on their next drive and the Bearcats increased their lead to 19 with Ridder's third touchdown pass of the game, a 26-yard toss to Ford. Though the Bearcats forced 4 turnovers on the day and only trailed briefly (1:39) in the 2nd quarter, they continued to face criticism on not dominating so-called lesser opponents. The win was the Bearcats' 17th straight win in the regular season, 4th consecutive win over Tulane and 15th straight in conference play. Following the win, it was announced that the University of Cincinnati would be the site of ESPN College GameDay ahead of their homecoming game against Tulsa.

Video Highlights: https://www.youtube.com/watch?v=qAAcJs23l34&list=PLUvEY5-fj1NAQI7K7O5pAClbKrvWDYCLV&index=8

Tulsa

Following a raucous, rollicking ESPN College Gameday pregame show held just west of Nippert Stadium on the McMicken Commons on Saturday morning, the AP/USA Today 2nd ranked Bearcats hosted Tulsa for Homecoming. The Bearcats were ranked 6th in the initial College Football Playoff Poll.

The Bearcats wasted no time in getting on the scoreboard after holding Tulsa to a three-and-out on its first series. Going 53 yards in 7 plays, the key play was a 33-yard pass from Desmond Ridder to Jerome Ford. Ridder high-stepped into the end zone after a brilliant fake to Ford at the goal line to give the Bearcats a 7–0 lead. After a Golden Hurricane punt was downed at their own six-yard line, The Bearcats went on a 13-play, 94-yard drive capped by a 1-yard scoring run by Ford. Tulsa got on the board with a field goal and the Bearcats wasted another solid drive that got them inside the 20 as Tulsa recorded a pair of sacks and Christian Lowery missed a 43-yard field goal. The Golden Hurricane drove down the field in 12 plays using a bruising running game with Shamari Brooks scoring on an 8-yard run. Zack Long missed the extra point, making the score 14–9. After a Bearcats punt, Long hit on a 50-yard field goal and the Bearcats went into halftime with a 14–12 lead, the same score that they lead the week previous.

Ridder completed 3 straight passes to start the 2nd half, including a 40-yard connection to Alec Pierce. The next play, a Ridder to Pierce 12-yard pass, increased the Bearcats lead to 21–12. After the Bearcats stopped the Golden Hurricane on downs, Cincinnati again struck quickly, with Ridder hitting Michael Young Jr. on a 31-yard touchdown pass, and the Bearcats looked poised to bury the Golden Hurricane, leading 28–12. But the Golden Hurricane would not go quietly. Despite turning the ball over on their subsequent drive, Tulsa followed the game plan that the Bearcats' two previous opponents had success with – a patient, time-consuming drive fueled by runs. Time and again, Golden Hurricane runners Shamari Brooks and Anthony Watkins found running lanes for positive yardage and ground up time. The teams traded fumbles and Long missed a 50-yard field goal early in the 4th quarter. The Bearcats could not capitalize and the Golden Hurricane cut the lead to 8 with another lengthy time-consuming drive. After QB Davis Brin hit JuanCarlos Santana on a 21-yard touchdown pass, Brin passed to Sam Crawford Jr. for the two-point conversion and suddenly the Bearcats were in a wholly unexpected 4th quarter fight. After another ineffective offensive series by Cincinnati, the Golden Hurricane got the ball with 5:18 to play and methodically drove down the field. A sellout crowd grew anxious as Tulsa got closer and closer to a touchdown that could potentially tie the game with a two-point conversion. On 4th and 5 at the Cincinnati six-yard line, Brin's pass to Crawford was complete, but Ja'Von Hicks made a heroic open field tackle short of the line to gain, forcing the Golden Hurricane to turn to the ball over on downs. But the Bearcats were not out of danger yet, Taking over at their own two-yard line, the Bearcats stunningly turned the ball over on the very first play after the possession change when Ridder fumbled the snap. To the horror of the Nippert crowd, the Golden Hurricane had the ball back and were once again inside the Bearcat 5 with a real threat to tie the game. Two runs by Brooks got the ball to the 1. Brin appeared to slide into the end zone on a 3rd down run around left end, but his knee went down short of the goal line. On 4th down, with the capacity crowd at a near frenzy pleading for a last stop to save the game, The Blackcat defense came up aces; stonewalling Tulsa running back Steven Anderson short of the goal line with the ball coming loose as he tried to stretch for the score. The fumble was recovered by Jabari Taylor in the end zone resulting in a touchback. The Bearcats ran out the clock and escaped what would have been a devastating playoff wrecking scenario with a 28–20 Homecoming win. Extending their school record home winning streak to 25, second longest current in the nation behind Clemson's 33.

The Bearcats won despite giving up 297 yards rushing, being out-gained on offense (446–390) turning over the ball three times and again losing time of possession by nearly 10 minutes. The win increased the Bearcats win streak at home to 25 dating back to the end of the 2017 season. When Bearcats Head Coach Luke Fickell saw that his players weren't celebrating the win in the locker room afterwards, he talked to them about not taking winning for granted and ignoring the focus on style points as it relates to the College Football Playoff. "Don't lose sight about what this is all about," he said. "Some people can strip the joy from you. I won't do that as a coach."

Video Highlights: https://www.youtube.com/watch?v=ixo2hTsMFTs&list=PLUvEY5-fj1NAQI7K7O5pAClbKrvWDYCLV&index=11

at South Florida

After flirting with disaster in their previous game against Tulsa, many pundits speculated that the Bearcats would be punished in the subsequent College Football Playoff (CFP) rankings, but to the surprise of many, the Bearcats ranking improved from 6th to 5th behind Georgia, Alabama, Oregon and Ohio State and ahead of notable teams like Michigan, Michigan State and Oklahoma. Buoyed by the improved CFP ranking, the Bearcats (2nd in AP/3rd in USA Today-Coaches) traveled to Tampa to take on South Florida in a Friday night affair.

The Bearcats started slow, trading turnovers with the Bulls on three straight possessions. The Bearcats' second turnover was costly as Bulls LB Christian Williams intercepted a Desmond Ridder pass and returned it 61 yards to the Bearcat 2 yard line. RB Jaren Mangham scored from 2 yards out and the Bulls grabbed an early 7–0 lead. The Bearcats responded with a 9-play, 75-yard drive highlighted by seven consecutive Ridder completions (Ridder was 8/9 in the quarter), but it was Ryan Montgomery who finished the drive with a 12-yard scoring run. The Bearcats got the ball back after a USF punt and again went on a long scoring drive. Ridder continued his completion streak with another four straight connections on the drive and finished it with a 13-yard run of his own to give the Bearcats the lead. Sauce Gardner snuffed out a Bulls drive with an interception and the Bearcats made short work of another drive with Ridder completing a short TD pass to Tre Tucker. The touchdown pass moved Ridder into the all-time lead for Bearcats touchdown passes formerly held by Gino Guiduli, the Bearcats quarterback coach. After a 27-yard field goal by Alex Bales, Cincinnati went into the half with a 24–7 lead. Ridder was an electric 20/22 for 170 yards in the first half.

The Bearcats picked right up where they left off to start the 2nd half. Taking the kickoff, the Bearcats marched downfield on an 8-play, 81-yard drive, capped off by a 21-yard pass from Ridder to Josh Whyle. Holding a commanding 31–7 lead, many thought this was the type of dominating performance that would quiet critics and impress the playoff committee. The Bulls had other plans as they went 75 yards in 12 plays with Mangham scoring again from 1 yard out. After Cincinnati punted, Bulls QB Timmy McClain completed a short slant pass to WR Jimmy Horn Jr, who stunned the Bearcats defense by racing up the sideline for an 80-yard score. The Bearcats lead was cut to 31–21, the Bulls having scored 14 in less than three minutes of game time. The Bearcats responded with 73 yards in 10 plays, and Ethan Wright capped off the drive with a 1-yard run, extending the lead back to 17 at 38–21. The Bearcats looked poised for a final kill shot when Charles McClelland forced and recovered a Bulls fumble on the USF 20, but four plays inside the 5 proved fruitless as Wright was stopped on 4th down and fumbled at the 2. The Bulls went on a 98-yard drive and cut the lead back to 10 when McClain scored on a 2-yard run. The Bearcats punted the ball back to the Bulls who looked to put together another long scoring drive but McClain was intercepted by DeShaun Pace to squash the possible threat and Ryan Montgomery sealed the game with a 55-yard scoring sprint on the first  play after the turnover to make the final score 45–28. The Bearcats dominated the game in 1st downs, had more total yards, and held the Bulls to 101 yards rushing, a marked improvement from the previous 3 games in which their opponents averaged 229 yards rushing. The Bearcats won the time of possession for the first time in the 2021 season (32:30–27:30). Ridder finished 31/39 for 304 yards and 2 scores and had 65 yards rushing and a rushing score as well. The Bearcats notched their 3rd season in the last four with at least 10 wins and their 18th straight regular season win.

Video Highlights: https://www.youtube.com/watch?v=QODRq5xtQqQ&list=PLUvEY5-fj1NAQI7K7O5pAClbKrvWDYCLV&index=12

SMU

Maintaining their #5 ranking and being dropped to 3 in the coaches poll (matching their AP ranking), the Bearcats hosted SMU at Nippert Stadium. Thirty seniors, including Desmond Ridder, Alec Pierce, Michael Young, Leonard Taylor, Ja'Von Hicks, Coby Bryant, Bryan Cook, Myjai Sanders, Joel Dublanko, Malik Vann, and Curtis Brooks, were honored before the game.

The Bearcats wasted no time asserting that this would not be a reprise of any of the close contests in the weeks previous. On Cincinnati's first offensive play, QB Desmond Ridder found WR Tyler Scott on a post pattern for a 53-yard touchdown. The Bearcats and Mustangs traded punts before a partially blocked punt by Wilson Huber gave the Bearcats excellent field position at the SMU 25. Four plays later, RB Jerome Ford scored from 4 yards out and the Bearcats had a 14–0 lead. CB Coby Bryant caused a RB Tre Siggers fumble on SMU's next possession to snuff out a Mustang drive deep in Bearcats territory. The Bearcats then started a drive that bridged into the next quarter; facing a 4th and 1, Ridder ran a run-pass option, nearly slipped as he turned the corner, but recovered and raced 40 yards for the touchdown. Alex Bales missed the PAT, so the score stood at 20–0. The Mustangs were having an increasingly tough time against a fired up defense fueled by an energetic crowd. Another Mustang three-and-out gave the Bearcats the ball back and they rumbled 78 yards in 6 plays, including a spectacular diving catch by WR Tre Tucker for a 19-yard gain. Ridder found WR Alec Pierce on a crossing route from 17 yards out giving the Bearcats a 27–0 lead. The Bearcats next two drives ended in failed field goal attempts; the first was blocked and the second was wide right. Nevertheless, the Mustangs offense had been completely stifled by the Cincinnati defense and the teams went to halftime with the score 27–0.
 
The Bearcats took the second half kickoff and drove 92 yards on a punishing drive. Ridder and Tucker hooked up for a 39-yard completion that nearly resulted in a score, but got the ball to the 1 yard line. Jerome Ford seemingly scored on the next play from the 1, but the score was nullified by a false start penalty. From the 6 yard line, Ridder tossed the ball to Ford going left who flipped the ball back to WR Jordan Jones going the opposite direction who completed the pass to Ridder in the end zone. Another touchdown pass from Ridder to Pierce ran the score up to 41–0. A blocked SMU field goal attempt late in the 3rd quarter kept the shutout going. Evan Prater would take over at QB late in the 3rd and would direct a scoring drive of his own, which included an electrifying 33-yard run. Prater would find Jones for an 11-yard score to push the tally to 48–0. SMU would eventually score a pair of late TDs against the Bearcats backups. Cincinnati held the AAC's passing yardage leader Tanner Mordecai (whose previous low was 243 passing yards) to 66 yards passing. Mordecai came into the game second nationally with 37 TD passes but was limited to a single touchdown thrown late in the 4th quarter. Ridder became the first in program history to have a passing, rushing, and receiving score in the same game. Jerome Ford added 82 yards rushing, Tre Tucker had a career best 114 receiving yards on 7 catches. The Bearcat defense held SMU's high powered offense to just 199 yards total, their lowest total since the last time they faced Cincinnati in 2020 when they were held to 290. Meanwhile, the Bearcat offense rang up 544 yards, 24 first downs, held the ball for over 35 minutes and punted just one time. The Bearcats completed their 3rd straight unbeaten regular season home schedule, their 26th straight home win, 18th straight home conference win, and their first 11–0 start since 2009. The Bearcats also clinched a berth in the conference championship against Houston.

Video Highlights: https://www.youtube.com/watch?v=Gwq9HevZOWQ&list=PLUvEY5-fj1NAQI7K7O5pAClbKrvWDYCLV&index=13

at East Carolina

Though the Bearcats ranking dropped to 4 in both the Coaches and AP poll, they became the first team from a "Group of Five" conference to be included in the top four of the College Football Playoff rankings. Armed with this latest landmark ranking, the Bearcats traveled to Greenville, NC for a Friday afternoon nationally televised regular season finale against East Carolina at Dowdy-Ficklen Stadium.

The Pirates took the opening kickoff and went three-and-out. The ensuing punt was blocked by Ryan Royer setting up the Bearcats in excellent field position. The Bearcats drove to the Pirate 13 yard line, but a penalty and two sacks moved the ball back to the 27. The scoring opportunity went by the boards as Alex Bales missed a 45-yard field goal. The Pirates then drove 56 yards on 12 plays with Owen Daffer connecting from 35 yards out to give ECU a 3–0 lead which the Pirates carried into the 2nd quarter. The Bearcats put together a 5-play, 76-yard drive capped by a 44 yard bomb from QB Desmond Ridder to TE Leonard Taylor for the score, giving the Bearcats a 7–3 lead. After another Pirate punt, Ridder hooked up with WR Alec Pierce on a 53 yard pass to put the Bearcats inside the 5 yard line. Two plays later, RB Jerome Ford rumbled into the end zone and the Bearcats had a 14–3 lead. The Bearcats offense continue to move swiftly after another Pirates punt,  grinding a 7-play, 88-yard drive capped off by a 28 yard pass from Ridder to Pierce in which the senior WR outjumped and outfought the defender for the ball in the end zone for the score. With the lead at 21–3, Cincinnati squandered a chance to increase the lead late in the 2nd quarter when Ford fumbled inside the 5. Nevertheless, the Bearcats defense dominated the 2nd quarter holding the Pirates to two first downs and 15 net yards gained.

The 3rd quarter was very sluggish as neither team could string together a solid drive. The Pirates did manage to cobble together an 11-play, 58-yard drive and set up for a 49-yard field goal. It was blocked but the play was nullified by an offside penalty. Given a second chance from 44 yards, Daffer made the kick, cutting the lead to 21–6 entering the 4th quarter. The Pirates put together another drive in the 4th and had Daffer attempt a 35-yard field goal, but the kick was again blocked by Arquan Bush. Sauce Gardner picked up the blocked kick and raced 60 yards the other way for a Bearcats touchdown. With the score 28–6, the Pirates put together a 5-play, 75-yard drive for a score to cut the lead back to 15. Cincinnati failed to take advantage of a LB Darrian Beavers interception, getting intercepted themselves in the end zone to kill another scoring opportunity. On the subsequent drive, DE Jabari Taylor forced a QB Holton Ahlers fumble which was recovered by DT Marcus Brown at the ECU 39 yard line. The Bearcats capped off the scoring when RB Ryan Montgomery scored from 2 yards out. The 35–13 final score finished a 12–0 season by the Bearcats, the second in program history (2009). It was UC's 15th straight conference win, 4th straight against ECU, and 38th straight against unranked opponents. Jerome Ford finished with 87 yards rushing and Alec Pierce led all players with 136 yards receiving. Desmond Ridder finished 17/28 for 301 yards and became the AAC's all-time leader in total yardage, passing Quinton Flowers of USF. Ridder also broke the Bearcats career passing yardage record once held by his quarterback coach Gino Guidugli. The win completed a second straight unbeaten regular season slate and clinched home field advantage in the American Athletic Conference Championship game against Houston.

Video Highlights: https://www.youtube.com/watch?v=Are1wza5dLI&list=PLUvEY5-fj1NAQI7K7O5pAClbKrvWDYCLV&index=14

No. 21 Houston (AAC Championship Game)

Retaining their #4 CFP ranking (#3 in AP poll), the Bearcats hosted the 2021 American Football Championship against the 11–1 Houston Cougars. The Bearcats hosted the game as they were the higher ranked CFP team (The Cougars came into the game ranked #21). The Cougars came into the game armed with a lengthy winning streak of their own, having won 11 straight after a season opening loss to Texas Tech.

Taking the opening kickoff, the Cougars marched right down the field mixing runs and passes to get into Cincinnati territory. The Bearcats defense stiffened and forced the Cougars to settle for a 37-yard field goal by Dalton Witherspoon to take an early 3–0 lead. The Bearcats responded with a crisp 5-play, 82-yard drive with QB Desmond Ridder completing passes to four different receivers. Ridder found WR Tyler Scott on a 25-yard post pattern pass in the end zone to give the Bearcats a 7–3 lead. The Cougars responded with a solid touchdown drive of their own, going 74 yards in 10 plays, capped by a QB Clayton Tune pass to WR Nathaniel Dell. That lead was short lived as on the Bearcat first play from scrimmage following the kickoff Jerome Ford took the handoff, slipped through right side and dashed 79 yards untouched for a touchdown. It was Ford's 3rd touchdown run of 75+ yards of the season. The Bearcats were back in front 14–10 and the sellout crowd of 37,978 buckled in for what was shaping up to be a high scoring shootout. The Cougars strung together another time-consuming drive but once again the Bearcats defense stopped Houston inside the 30. Witherspoon connected on a 46-yard field goal to narrow the Cincinnati lead to 14–13. The Bearcats could not extend their lead after a fine kickoff return by Tre Tucker set the Bearcats up in Houston territory. The Bearcats got inside the 10 but the drive stalled and Christian Lowery missed a 23-yard field goal. The Bearcats took a 14–13 lead into halftime.

Taking the second half kickoff, the Bearcats went 75 yards on 6 plays, highlighted by a 44-yard pass from Ridder to WR Alec Pierce who made a spectacular diving catch on a seemingly overthrown ball. The Bearcats took advantage of a 4th down pass interference call on Houston and scored on an 8-yard swing pass from Ridder to TE Leonard Taylor. With the score now 21–13, the Cougars next drive ended after one play as LB Joel Dublanko intercepted a Tune pass and returned it to the Houston 23 yard line. Two plays later, Pierce out jumped Houston CB Marcus Jones in the end zone and the Bearcats now held a 28–13 lead less than 5 minutes into the 2nd half. The Cougars went three-and-out on their next series and punted. Three plays later, Ford broke over the left side finding a wide-open seam and sprinted 42 yards for a touchdown, the third of the 3rd quarter in less than 8 minutes of game time. The 3rd quarter continued to be a nightmare for the Cougars as the Bearcats "Blackcat defense" continued to stifle them at every turn. The Cougars were held to −6 yards offense in the 3rd quarter, gaining one first down, and no points. The Cougars did manage to score a touchdown midway through the 4th quarter to close the gap to 35–20, but that would be as close as they would get. Much of the sellout crowd stormed the field at the games conclusion in celebration as the Bearcats clinched their second straight American Athletic Football Championship with the win. Jerome Ford was named the Most Outstanding Player with 187 rushing yards and two touchdowns. Desmond Ridder only completed 11 passes on 17 attempts for 190 yards. His passes were judicious and sparingly needed as the Bearcat running game rang up 210 yards. The "Blackcats defense" registered 8 sacks, with Joel Dublanko notching a pair to go along with 7 tackles and the games lone turnover on the 3rd quarter interception. The Bearcats won despite only having the ball 19 minutes on offense. The class of 2022 would graduate as not only the winningest class in school history but also unbeaten at home. UC's 27 game home win streak is also a school record and second longest in the country. The Bearcats ended the evening as the nation's only unbeaten team in the 2021 season and with the final results of the College Football Playoff poll the next day would be chosen as one of the final four teams that would play in the national semifinal for the CFP national championship.

Video Highlights: https://www.youtube.com/watch?v=PvxXzCB7s1g&list=PLUvEY5-fj1NAQI7K7O5pAClbKrvWDYCLV&index=15

vs. No. 1 Alabama

Selected as the #4 ranked team in the final College Football Playoff rankings, the AAC Champion and undefeated Bearcats qualified for the College Football Playoff Semifinals and would face #1 Alabama the champions of the Southeastern Conference (SEC). The Crimson Tide not only came into the game as defending national champions, having defeated Ohio State 52–24 in the 2021 iteration of the CFP Championship, but stood as the most experienced team in CFP history having only one time failed to qualify as one of the selected teams for the yearly playoff. Cincinnati on the other hand was not only making its first-ever CFP playoff but would be the first team from the so-called "Group of Five" to be selected for the CFP The Bearcats in an odd schedule quirk would end up playing on the first (In the Peach Bowl on 1/1/21) and last days of the 2021 calendar year. Coincidentally their 2021 Peach Bowl opponent Georgia, also qualified for the CFP as the #3 seeded team playing Big Ten Champion Michigan in the other CFP semifinal in the Orange Bowl. This would be the first time that the Bearcats would be playing in the Cotton Bowl Classic and its first meeting since the 1990 season. It would also be its first-ever meeting against Alabama in a bowl game.

The Bearcats won the toss and deferred to the 2nd half. The Crimson Tide took the opening kickoff and taking a page from the Tulsa and Navy playbook, they methodically marched downfield as their first 10 plays were runs, six by 5th year senior Brian Robinson. But Heisman Trophy winner Bryce Young capped the drive with his first pass a short underneath connection with Slade Robinson who rumbled in from 8 yards out and the Tide took an early 7-0 lead. Unfazed the Bearcats took their first possession and smartly moved downfield themselves. Quick hitter runs by Jerome Ford mixed in with Desmond Ridder passes chewed up yards and clock. A pair of completions of 19 and 22 yards to Tyler Scott got the Bearcats into the red zone. A frustrated Tide called a time out which might have woken them up. With the ball at the 9, Ridder's first down pass was batted down, his second down pass found a leaping Alec Pierce in the end zone but it slipped through his grasp. third down was a disaster as the Tide sniffed out the swing pass to Leonard Taylor and he was dropped for a 6 yard loss. The Bearcats had to settle for a field goal and to a few surprised fans embattled senior Cole Smith banged a 33 yard field goal through the uprights and the score was 7-3. The Tide took the ensuing kickoff and again used a mix of short passes and punishing runs to methodically move the ball down field. The drive crossed into the 2nd quarter but stalled at the 3. The Tide settled for a field goal to increase their lead to 10-3. The next three Bearcat drives did nothing as they gained a total of 12 yards combined on those drives. The Black Cat defense was holding their own and the Tide could not increase their lead, missing a field goal attempt midway through the period. The Bearcats nearly had a golden opportunity when the Tide muffed a punt return deep in their own end, but recovered and went on another punishing drive. Taking great care to avoid throwing anywhere in the area of Sauce Gardner, the Tide moved the ball to the Bearcat 44. Young gambled on a deep ball on the other side of the coverage and connected with Ja'Corey Brooks. Brooks hauled in the pass and beat safety Bryan Cook to the pylon for the score. The lead was now 17-3, the lead the Tide took into the half.

Taking the 2nd half kickoff, the Bearcats put together a solid drive but it stalled at the 19. Cole Smith was called on for a 37 yard field goal attempt and connected cutting the deficit to 17-6, which was the score going into the 4th. The teams traded punts and Young threw an interception to Bryan Young. The ensuing drive was a nightmare as Ridder had another pass batted away and then was sacked on 3rd down by Will Anderson Jr. The Bearcats punted again where the Tide applied the finishing touches with a 9 play 70 yard drive. Robinson was the hammer of this drive and the Bearcats simply could not stop or slow down the punishing runs. a third touchdown pass from Young, this time on a 9 yard pass to Cameron Latu, effectively put the game away. The Tide ran for 301 yards, gained 482 overall and dominated the game with the final score being 27-6. The Bearcats were held to a season low 218 and held without a touchdown since losing 42-0 to Ohio State in the 2nd game of the 2019 season. Desmond Ridder passed for 144 yards but was sacked six times. Jerome Ford rushed for 77 yards. The Tide rushed for a team bowl record 301 yards, 204 from Robinson The CFP semifinal loss ended the Bearcats season at 13-1, and marks the first time since 2018 that no team will finish undefeated for the 2021-22 season. The 13 wins are the most in school history and the 3rd time in the last four seasons that they notched double digit wins. The Bearcats finished the 2021 season with their highest ever final ranking at #4 surpassing the #8 final rankings of the 2009 & 2020 teams.

Rankings

After the season

Awards and AAC honors

All-Americans

All Star games

NFL Draft

The NFL Draft was held in Las Vegas, Nevada on April 28–30, 2022. The nine picks are a school record and were the third most of any school in this year's draft. 

Bearcats picked in the 2022 NFL Draft:

References

Cincinnati
Cincinnati Bearcats football seasons
American Athletic Conference football champion seasons
Cincinnati Bearcats football